Ali Omar (born 13 April 1994) is a Libyan judoka. He competed in the 2020 Summer Olympics. He won a bronze medal at the 2020 African Judo Championships.

References

1994 births
Living people
Judoka at the 2020 Summer Olympics
Libyan male judoka
Olympic judoka of Libya
African Games competitors for Libya
Competitors at the 2019 African Games